State Route 149 (SR-149) is a state highway in Uintah County in the U.S. state of Utah that connects U.S. Route 40 (US-40) in the town of Jensen with Dinosaur National Monument,  to the north.

Route description
State Route 149 starts in the town of Jensen, Utah, travelling north on 9500 East. As it leaves town, it turns slightly to the east as the road turns into Quarry Entrance Road. While the road continues north into the Dinosaur National Monument, the legislated route ends at the monument boundary.

History
Route 149 was established on June 26, 1933, as the road from Jensen to the museum at Dinosaur National Monument. No changes were made to the route until August 20, 1987, when the state legislature determined that because state maintenance of the road ended at the monument boundary, the state route should be shortened so the route would also end at the boundary.

Major intersections

References

149
149